Paul John O'Reilly (born 4 August 1962) is a former English cricketer.  O'Reilly was a right-handed batsman who bowled right-arm fast-medium.  He was born in Watford, Hertfordshire.

O'Reilly made his debut for Hertfordshire in the 1996 MCCA Knockout Trophy against Dorset.  O'Reilly played Minor counties cricket for Hertfordshire from 1996 to 2003, which included 26 Minor Counties Championship matches and 9 MCCA Knockout Trophy matches.  In 2001, he made his List A debut against the Durham Cricket Board in the Cheltenham & Gloucester Trophy.  He made 3 further List A appearances for the county, the last coming against Bedfordshire in the 1st round of the 2003 Cheltenham & Gloucester Trophy, which was held in 2002.  In his 4 List A matches, he took 2 wickets at an average of 48.50, with best figures of 2/54.

References

External links
Paul O'Reilly at ESPNcricinfo
Paul O'Reilly at CricketArchive

1962 births
Living people
Sportspeople from Watford
English cricketers
Hertfordshire cricketers